{{DISPLAYTITLE:C19H24N2O}}
The molecular formula C19H24N2O (molar mass: 296.41 g/mol) may refer to:

 Eburnamine
 Heyneanine
 Noribogaine
 Imipraminoxide
 Palonosetron
 RTI-171
 

Molecular formulas